The Principality of Bulgaria was a  vassal state under the suzerainty of the Ottoman Empire. It was established by the Treaty of Berlin in 1878.

After the Russo-Turkish War ended with a Russian victory, the Treaty of San Stefano was signed by Russia and the Ottoman Empire on 3 March 1878. Under this, a large Bulgarian vassal state was agreed to, which was significantly larger: its lands encompassed nearly all ethnic Bulgarians in the Balkans, and included most of Moesia, Thrace and Macedonia, stretching from the Black Sea to the Aegean. However, the United Kingdom and Austria-Hungary were against the establishment of such a large Russian client state in the Balkans, fearing it would shift the balance of power in the Mediterranean. Due to this, the great powers convened and signed the Treaty of Berlin, superseding the Treaty of San Stefano, which never went into effect. This created a much smaller principality, alongside an autonomous Eastern Rumelia within the Ottoman Empire.

In practice, Bulgaria's status as an Ottoman vassal was a legal fiction, and Bulgaria only acknowledged the authority of the Sublime Porte in a formal way.  It had its own Constitution, flag and anthem, and conducted its own foreign policy. From 1880, it had its own currency as well. In 1885, a bloodless revolution resulted in Eastern Rumelia being de facto annexed by Bulgaria, which the Ottoman Empire accepted with the Tophane Agreement. On 5 October 1908, Bulgaria declared its independence as the Kingdom of Bulgaria.

Background
In 1396 the Bulgarian–Ottoman Wars ended with the fall of the Bulgarian Empire, due to the Ottoman invasion of the Balkans and its own internal divisions. Under Ottoman rule, the Bulgarian nobility was destroyed and the national consciousness suppressed. The Bulgarian National Revival, emerging in the late 18th century, revived Bulgarian identity and stoked the idea of creating a new Bulgarian state. Numerous revolutionary movements and uprisings against the Ottomans occurred alongside similar movements in the rest of the Balkans, culminating in the Russo-Turkish War of 1877 to 1878.

Treaty of Berlin

The Treaty of San Stefano of March 3, 1878, proposed a Bulgarian state, which comprised the geographical regions of Moesia, Thrace and Macedonia. Based on that date Bulgarians celebrate Bulgaria's national day each year.

Fearing the establishment of a large Russian client state on the Balkans, the other great powers, however, were not willing to agree to the treaty. As a result, the Treaty of Berlin (1878), under the supervision of Otto von Bismarck of Germany and Benjamin Disraeli of United Kingdom, revised the earlier treaty, and scaled back the proposed Bulgarian state.

A widely autonomous Principality of Bulgaria was created, between the Danube and the Stara Planina range, with its seat at the old Bulgarian capital of Veliko Turnovo, and including Sofia. This state was to be under nominal Ottoman sovereignty but was to be ruled by a prince elected by a congress of Bulgarian notables and approved by the Powers. They insisted that the Prince could not be a Russian, but in a compromise Prince Alexander of Battenberg, a nephew of Tsar Alexander II, was chosen. An autonomous Ottoman province under the name of Eastern Rumelia was created south of the Stara Planina range, whereas Macedonia was returned under the sovereignty of the Sultan.

19th century

The Bulgarians adopted an advanced democratic constitution, and power soon passed to the Liberal Party led by Stefan Stambolov. Prince Alexander had conservative leanings, and at first opposed Stambolov's policies, but by 1885 he had become sufficiently sympathetic to his new country to change his mind, and supported the Liberals. He also supported the Unification of Bulgaria and Eastern Rumelia, which was brought about by a coup in Plovdiv in September 1885. The Powers did not intervene because of the power struggles between them. Shortly after, Serbia declared war on Bulgaria in the hope of grabbing territory while the Bulgarians were distracted. The Bulgarians defeated them at Slivnitsa, pushed the Serbian army into Serbia and succeeded to re-conquer the seized by the Berlin Treaty Bulgarian populated towns of Pirot and Vranya, but they were given back to Serbia with the Treaty of Bucharest in 1886.

These events made Alexander very popular in Bulgaria, but Russia was increasingly dissatisfied at the liberal tendencies under his reign. In August 1886 they fomented a coup, in the course of which Alexander was forced to abdicate and was exiled to Russia. Stambolov, however, acted quickly and the participants in the coup were forced to flee the country. Stambolov tried to reinstate Alexander, but strong Russian opposition forced the prince to abdicate again. In July 1887 the Bulgarians elected Ferdinand of Saxe-Coburg-Gotha as their new Prince. Ferdinand was the "Austrian candidate" and the Russians refused to recognise him. Ferdinand initially worked with Stambolov, but by 1894 their relationship worsened. Stambolov resigned and was assassinated in July 1895. Ferdinand then decided to restore relations with Russia, which meant returning to a conservative policy.

20th century

There was a substantial Bulgarian population still living under Ottoman rule, particularly in Macedonia. To complicate matters, Serbia and Greece too made claims over parts of Macedonia, while Serbia, as a Slavic nation, also considered Macedonians
as belonging to Serbian nation. Thus began a five-sided struggle for control of these areas which lasted until World War I. In 1903 there was a Bulgarian insurrection in Ottoman Macedonia and war seemed likely. In 1908 Ferdinand used the struggles between the Great Powers to declare Bulgaria a fully independent kingdom, with himself as Tsar, which he did on 5 October (though celebrated on 22 September, as Bulgaria remained officially on the Julian calendar until 1916) in the Holy Forty Martyrs Church, Veliko Tarnovo.

Ilinden-Preobrazhenie Uprising

The main external political problem confronting Bulgaria throughout the period up to World War I was the fate of Macedonia and Eastern Thrace. At the end of 19th century the Internal Macedonian-Adrianople Revolutionary Organization was founded and began the preparation of an armed uprising in the regions still occupied by the Ottoman Turks. Relying in part on nationwide support on the part of the Principality of Bulgaria, IMARO got down to organizing a network of committees in Macedonia and Thrace. In August 1903 a mass armed uprising, known in history as the Ilinden-Preobrajenie, broke out in Macedonia and Thrace. Its aim was to liberate those regions, or at least to draw the attention of the Great Powers and make them advocate for the improvement of the living conditions for the population through legal and economic reforms. After three months of fierce battles the Ottoman army crushed the uprising using much cruelty against the civilian population.

List of Princes of Bulgaria

Gallery

See also
History of Bulgaria (1878–1946)

References

External links
Rulers of Bulgaria at World Statesmen

States and territories established in 1878
States and territories disestablished in 1908
1878 establishments in the Ottoman Empire
1908 disestablishments in Europe
1870s in Bulgaria
1880s in Bulgaria
1890s in Bulgaria
1900s in Bulgaria
Vassal states of the Ottoman Empire
Former principalities
Former protectorates